The Communist Party of Bolivia (Marxist–Leninist) (Spanish: Partido Comunista de Bolivia (marxista-leninista), PCB (ML)) was a political party in Bolivia. PCB (ML) emerged as a pro-People's Republic of China splinter group of the Communist Party of Bolivia in 1965. PCB (ML) was led by Óscar Zamora Medinaceli.

In 1978 PCB (ML) founded the Revolutionary Left Front (FRI) as an open mass front. In the parliamentary elections of 1978 the FRI won 1.2% of the votes. In subsequent elections FRI was a candidate in alliances with MNR, MIR and ADN. Later, FRI became a social democratic party.

The central press organ of PCB (ML) was Liberación.

Today PCB (ML) no longer exists although FRI has continued.

See also
Communist Party  of Bolivia - Marxist Leninist Maoist
People's Revolutionary Front (Marxist−Leninist−Maoist)

References

1965 establishments in Bolivia
Communist parties in Bolivia
Defunct political parties in Bolivia
Political parties established in 1965
Political parties with year of disestablishment missing